A chef de cuisine (French for head of kitchen) or  head chef is a chef that leads a kitchen and its cooks. A chef patron (feminine form chef patronne) (French for boss chef) or executive chef is a chef that manages multiple kitchens and their staff.

Function 

The chef de cuisine is in charge of all activities related to the kitchen, which usually includes creating menus, managing kitchen staff, ordering and purchasing stock and equipment, plating design, enforces nutrition, safety, and sanitation, and ensuring the quality of the meals that are served in the restaurant. Chef de cuisine is the traditional French term, meaning "chief of the kitchen" or "kitchen manager", from which the English word chef is derived. Head chef is often used to designate someone with the same duties as an executive chef but, in larger restaurants there is usually someone in charge of a head chef such a general manager, who makes executive decisions such as the direction of the menu, has final authority regarding staff hiring and management decisions and sets the overall tone and style of the restaurant. This is often the case for executive chefs who are in charge of several restaurants. In many restaurants, executive chef or chef de cuisine will have a line-up/pre-shift (meetings with front of house (FOH) and back of house (BOH)) in order to prepare for the service and answer questions about the menu. In some food operations, the executive chef may assist in designing the menu, dining room and kitchen. He or she may also work with food purveyors, catering directors, equipment vendors, financial consultants, the media, sanitation inspectors and dietitians.

An executive chef generally does not partake in food preparation or catering of patrons. Despite the title containing the word chef it is uncommon for executive chefs to cook and be in a kitchen.

References

See also 

 List of restaurant terminology
 Brigade de cuisine

Chefs
Culinary terminology